David Paton (born 29 October 1949) is a Scottish bassist, guitarist and singer. He first achieved success in the mid-1970s as lead vocalist and bassist of Pilot, who scored hits with "Magic", "January", "Just a Smile" and "Call Me Round" before splitting in 1977. Paton is also known for his work in the original lineup of The Alan Parsons Project (1975-1985), and for working with acts such as Kate Bush, Camel and Elton John.

Biography

Born in Edinburgh, Scotland, Paton grew up in the south-eastern suburb of Gilmerton, Edinburgh, where he attended Liberton High School. His first band was called 'The Beachcombers' and they signed a recording contract in 1968 with CBS Records. They changed their name to The Boots and published their first single, "The Animal In Me". This was soon followed by "Keep Your Lovelight Burning", but after about two years, the band split because of financial problems in 1970. He then replaced a guitarist in the Bay City Rollers for a short period of time but never recorded with them. After leaving them in October 1970, he became a member of another Band called 'Fresh', which changed their name to Christyan and published a single, "Nursery Lane", in 1971. While still playing with the band, he took a job as a musician in a nightclub called Tiffanys where he met Ian Bairnson.

In 1973, Paton was a co-founder of Pilot. With Ian Bairnson, Billy Lyall and Stuart Tosh, they recorded several demos with EMI Records and recorded their first album From the Album of the Same Name which was published in 1974. On it was included their first major hit, "Magic"  and Bairnson, who was still not an official member of the band, joined them after the recording of the first album. They released their second album Second Flight in 1975, and its single "January" topped the UK Singles Chart for three weeks, ironically beginning week ending 1 February. and it was followed in 1976 by their third, Morin Heights which was recorded at Le Studio in Morin Heights in Quebec, Canada, and produced by Roy Thomas Baker. 

The same year, he and Bairnson started working with producer Alan Parsons and published a first album under the name Alan Parsons Project, Tales of Mystery & Imagination. Paton played bass and sang with the band until the 1986 album Stereotomy as he continued to work with other artists as a session musician. He also played on the first two albums by Kate Bush in 1978, The Kick Inside and Lionheart. 

In the 1980s, Paton was known for his work with Camel and Elton John in studio albums and touring around the world. Other credits include bass guitar and backing vocals for several albums by Fish, as well as Rick Wakeman in the 1990s, such as The Classical Connection, African Bach, Softsword, The Classical Connection 2 and Prayers. In 1984, he was a member of Keats. In 1985, he participated to the original score for the movie Ladyhawke which was written, composed and played by Andrew Powell and produced by Alan Parsons.

His first solo album was released in 1991, titled Passions Cry (under the name of Davie Paton), and the second album Fragments in 1996, that was also under the same name. In 1980, Paton already recorded an album with the title No Ties No Strings at the Abbey Road Studios, which was never released. In 2003, however, the album The Search was released, which was a new recording of the "lost album" from 1980. In the following years, David Paton released other solo albums.

Paton also appeared solo in the Countdown Spectacular 2 concert series in Australia, between August and September 2007, as a performer and musical director.

Discography

Solo
 1991: Passions Cry
 1996: Fragments
 2003: The Search
 2007: Fellow Man
 2009: The Studio Diary Songs
 2012: Under the Sun
 2019: The Traveller
 2020: 2020

David Paton & Friends 
 2007: Originals

Boots 
Singles:
 1968: "The Animal in Me"
 1968: "Keep Your Lovelight Burning"

Christyan 
Single:
 1971: "Nursery Lane"

Pilot 
Studio albums:
 1974: From the Album of the Same Name 
 1975: Second Flight 
 1976: Morin Heights - recorded in Morin Heights Le Studio
 1977: Two's a Crowd
 2002: Blue Yonder 
 2008: The Craighall Demos 71:76 
 2014: A Pilot Project - David Paton's tribute to The Alan Parsons Project

Compilation albums: 
 1980: The Best of Pilot
 1997: Magic 
 1997: Magic: A Golden Classics Edition 
 2004: A's, B's & Rarities

Alan Parsons Project 
Studio albums:
 1976: Tales of Mystery and Imagination
 1977: I Robot
 1978: Pyramid
 1979: Eve
 1980: The Turn of a Friendly Card
 1982: Eye in the Sky
 1984: Ammonia Avenue
 1985: Vulture Culture
 1985: Stereotomy

Compilation albums:
 1981: Trilogy - compilations, including I Robot, Pyramid and Eve albums on 3 CDs 
 1981: I Robot / Pyramid / Eve / The Turn of a Friendly Card - box set, including these 4 albums on 4 CDs
 1983: The Best of The Alan Parsons Project 
 1985: Vulture Culture: The Alan Parsons Project Special
 1987: The Best of The Alan Parsons Project - Volume 2
 1987: Limelight - The Best of Vol.2
 1988: The Instrumental Works
 1989: Pop Classics
 1991: Prime Time: The Alan Parsons Project Best
 1991: Anthology (Connoisseur Collection 
 1992: Anthology - distributed in Italy only 
 1992: Hits in the Sky distributed in Hong Kong only
 1992: The Best of the Alan Parsons Project - distributed in France only 
 1992: The Best of The Alan Parsons Project - double album distributed in Germany only
 1992: The Ultimate Collection - double album
 1997: Gold Collection - double album
 1997: The Definitive Collection - double album
 1999: 36 All-Time Greatest Hits - double album
 1999: Eye in the Sky: The Encore Collection 1999: Master Hits: The Heritage Series 
 2003: Silence and I - The Very Best Of - 3-CD box set distributed in Germany only
 2003: Platinum & Gold Collection 2007: The Essential Alan Parsons Project - double album
 2008: Best of Alan Parsons Project 2010: The Collection 2010: Original Album Classics - 5-CD box set, including Pyramid, The Turn of a Friendly Card, Eve, Stereotomy and Gaudy 2014: The Complete Albums Collection - box set, including all 10 albums and 1 never before released CD The Sicilian Defence Kate Bush 
Studio albums:
 1978: The Kick Inside 
 1978: LionheartCompilation albums: 
 1983: The Single File 
 1986: The Whole Story 
 1990: This Woman's Work: Anthology 1978–1990Camel

1982: "The Single Factor"
1984: "Stationary Traveller"
1991: "Dust and Dreams'
1994: "On the Road 1982"
1996: "Harbour of Tears"

 Keats 
Single:
 1984: "Turn Your Heart Around" / "Ask No Questions"

Album:
 1984: Keats - reissued in 2015: with Peter Bardens, Colin Blunstone, Ian Bairnson, Stuart Elliott; produced by Alan Parsons

 Rick Wakeman 
Singles:
 1991: "Don't Fly Away" b/w "After Prayers"
 1996: "Welcome a Star" - Rick Wakeman & Ramon Remedios - Edited on Cassette Single & CD Single

Studio albums:
 1988: Time Machine - With Ashley Holt, Roy Wood, Tony Fernandez, etc. - Edited on Vinyl LP, Cassette & CD.
 1991: The Classical Connection 1991: African Bach 1991: Softsword 1993: The Classical Connection 2 - With Chris Squire, Bill Bruford & Steve Howe.
 1993: Prayers 
 1995: Rock & Pop Legends: Rick Wakeman - With Ashley Holt & Tony Fernandez. 
 1995: Almost Live in Europe - The title says it all, recordings were so bad they had to rework in studio after the tour. 
 1996: The New Gospels 1996: Can You Hear Me? 1996: OrisonsVideos:
 1988: The Word and The Gospels - VHS 
 1991: The Classical Connection Video - VHS. 
 1996: The New Gospels Video - VHS - With Adam Wakeman. 
 1998: Rick Wakeman Live Video - With Ashley Holt & Tony Fernandez. - First on VHS, later reedited on DVD.

 Fish 
Studio albums:
 1991: Internal Exile 1993: Songs from the Mirror 1994: SuitsLive albums:
 1991: Derek Dick & His Amazing Electric Bear 
 1992: There's a Guy Works Down the Chip Shop Swears He's Fish (unofficial release)
 1993: For Whom the Bells Toll 
 1993: Toiling in the Reeperbahn 
 1993: Uncle Fish & The Fish Creepers 
 1994: Acoustic Session 
 1994: Sushi 
 1994: Lucky Bastards (unofficial release, recorded 1991)
 1998: Fortunes of War (recorded 1994)
 1999: The Complete BBC Sessions (recorded 1989 and 1991)

Compilation albums:
 1998: Kettle of FishSingle: 
 1994: "Lady Let It Lie" / "Out of My Life" / "Black Canal"

 Sadie Paton 
Single:
 2012: Don't Touch Me 2018: Love Song Eric Woolfson 
 2009: Eric Woolfson sings The Alan Parsons Project That Never Was - David bass on Any Other Day and Rumour Goin' Round Collaborations 
 1974: Ra Ta Ta / Pamela - Scotch Mist - Single - Pamela written by William Lyall & David Paton. Alan Parsons prod.
 1975: Sail Away / Never Seen the Like - Jack Harris - Single - Also sang with The Alan Parsons Project.
 1975: First Day - David Courtney - With David Gilmour, Pilot, BJ Cole, Albert Lee, etc. Produced by Andrew Powell. 
 1976: Solo Casting - William Lyall - Also starring Phil Collins, Stuart Tosh, Ian Bairnson, Ronnie Leahy, etc.
 1976: You've Got to Get Me Higher / Now That I've Found You - Marilyn Miller - Single - Both songs by Billy Lyall. 
 1978: Dear Anyone - Don Black & Geoff Stephens
 1979: Crusader - Chris de Burgh - Also starring Stuart Elliott, Francis Monkman, Andrew Powell, Ian Bairnson. 
 1981: Chris Rea - Chris Rea 
 1981: Elaine Paige - Elaine Paige 
 1982: More Than a Dream - John Townley
 1982: Death Wish II Original Soundtrack - Jimmy Page - With Chris Farlowe, Dave Lawson, Dave Mattacks etc. 
 1982: Single Factor - Camel - Bass, lead and backing vocals on one song
 1983: Plays the Best of The Alan Parsons Project - Andrew Powell & The London Philarmonia Orchestra - Bass on two songs
 1984: Stationary Traveller - Camel - Bass on two songs, fretless bass on two other songs
 1985: Ice on Fire: Elton John - Paton bass on three songs
 1985: Ladyhawke Original Motion Picture Soundtrack - Andrew Powell - Produced By Alan Parsons
 1985: Performance-The Best of Tim Rice & Andrew Lloyd Webber - Various Artists
 1986: Leather Jackets - Elton John - David bass on 6 songs 
 1987: Live in Australia with the Melbourne Symphony Orchestra - Elton John 
 1988: Reg Strikes Back - Elton John - With Pete Townshend, Dee Murray, Nigel Olsson & Davey Johnstone
 1988: Love's a State of Mind - Silvia Griffin
 1989: Red Corner - Matia Bazar
 1989: You You - Frank Ryan 
 1990: Amada Mia - Catelina Caselli 
 1990: 1234 - Propaganda - David Paton and David Gilmour on Only one word 1990: Apri Le Braccia E Poi Vola - Ron
 1991: Dust & Dreams - Camel - Vocals on one song
 1992: Elvis Has Left the Building - The River Detectives 
 1994: The Last of the Independents - The Pretenders - With Ian Stanley (TFF), David Lord, etc.
 1994: On the Road 1982 - Camel - Bass and vocals 
 1995: Maiden Heaven - Fiona Kennedy
 1996: A Summer in Skye - Blair Douglas
 1996: Harbour of Tears - Camel - Bass and lead vocals on one song 
 1997: Half Moon Bay - Gerry O' Beirne
 1997: If I Ever Return - Connie Dover
 1997: Donegal Rain - Andy M. Stewart
 1998: Borderland - John McNairn
 1998: Presented to the Heart - Alexander Mesek
 1998: Redwood Cathedral - Dick Gaughan
 1999: Suileandubh (Dark Eyes - Tannas
 1999: Faileasan Uibhist - Margaret Callan 
 1999: Will You Walk on By/On the West Side - Donnie Munro with Holly Thomas - Single 
 2000: Highwired - McAllias
 2000: Donnie Munro - Donnie Munro
 2001: Green Indians: A Tribute to Kevin Wilkinson - Various Artists
 2002: Legacy: The Music of Marc Bolan & T Rex - Various Artists
 2002: Across the City and the World - Donnie Munro 
 2002: Oubliette - Holly Thomas 
 2003: If Only - Nobby Clark
 2003: Change - Ray Wilson - Paton bass on four songs 
 2006: Magical Hat - Beagle Hat - Paton lead vocals, electric guitar, acoustic guitar, piano, backing vocals
 2013: Don't Know What to Say - Nick Vernier Band - Paton lead vocals
 2019: One Fine Day - Chris Rea

 Production 
 2005: The Last Song in Abbey Road - Kenny Herbert - Paton bass and production 
 2006: Famous faces on a bar room wall - Kenny Herbert & Rab Howat - Paton bass and production 
 2007: Songs of our lives - Kenny Herbert & Rab Howat - Paton bass and production
 2008: All of my days - Kenny Herbert - Paton played and produced 
 2010: Another Positive Line'' - The Apple Beggars - Paton bass and production

References

External links
 
 
 Detailed list of Paton's session work

1949 births
Living people
Musicians from Edinburgh
Scottish pop guitarists
Male bass guitarists
Scottish bass guitarists
Scottish session musicians
People educated at Liberton High School
Pilot (band) members
Camel (band) members
Elton John Band members
The Alan Parsons Project members
Bay City Rollers members
Progressive rock bass guitarists